Angela Seung Ju Pucci (née  Lee, Chinese: 李胜珠, Korean: 이승주, July 8, 1996) is an American-Canadian mixed martial artist who is currently competing in ONE Championship.

On May 5, 2016, she became at 19 years old and 9 months the youngest person to ever win a world title in MMA by defeating Mei Yamaguchi to win the ONE Women's Atomweight (115 lbs) Title. Fight Matrix ranks her #13 female MMA Strawweight (105.1-115 lbs) in the world.

Background
Lee was born in Vancouver to a Chinese-Singaporean father Ken Lee and a South Korean-born Canadian mother Jewelz Lee. She moved to Hawaii with her family at age 7. Her parents are both martial artists, so she began training at a young age and competing at age 6. Her younger brother Christian is also an MMA fighter and her other younger brother Adrian (born in Waipahu), also trains in martial arts. Lee's younger sister Victoria, who was also a mixed martial artist signed to ONE, died in 2022 at the age of 18.

In 2011, Angela Lee won her division at the USA Amateur pankration national championships, and the next year, she claimed her division at the World Pangration Athlima Federation world championships in Greece. Lee was awarded her Brazilian Jiu-Jitsu black belt on February 9, 2018, by third-degree black belt Mike Fowler and her father Ken Lee, who is also a black belt.

Mixed martial arts career
In 2014, Lee made her amateur debut, and in November of that year she won an amateur title by beating Audrey Perkins at Destiny MMA: Na Koa 7 in Honolulu to become the Destiny MMA strawweight champion.

ONE Championship
Lee signed with ONE Championship in 2014 and made her promotional debut at ONE Championship 28: Warrior's Quest on May 22, 2015, submitting Aya Saber with an arm bar in the opening round. She competes under both the American and Singaporean flags.

Following the win, Lee dropped out of college in Hawaii (she was studying business) and moved to Singapore to join Evolve MMA. In her next fight, she used a rear naked choke hold to beat Mona Samir at ONE Championship: Odyssey of Champions on September 27, 2015, in the first round.

Lee's third professional fight was at ONE Championship 33: Pride of Lions on November 13, 2015, and she submitted Natalie Gonzales Hills with a twister in the opening round in what commentators described as a potential submission of the year contender. She subsequently won the 2015 WMMA Press Award for Submission of the Year.

Next, she faced Lena Tkhorevska at ONE Championship 36: Spirit of Champions on December 11, 2015, and won with a rear naked choke in the second round. Lee's first fight of 2016 was against Rebecca Heintzman at ONE Championship 39: Tribe of Warriors on February 20, 2016, and she won with a second round neck crank.

Lee's reward for submitting her first five opponents was a shot at the inaugural ONE Championship Atomweight Women's Title against Japanese veteran Mei Yamaguchi at ONE Championship 42: Ascent to Power on May 6, 2016. Winning the fight would make her the youngest-ever MMA world champion.

Lee won the fight by unanimous decision to become the inaugural ONE Women's Atomweight Champion, and received a $68,200 SGD bonus for her performance. The MMA media described her fight with Yamaguchi as a Fight of the Year contender. She subsequently signed a new contract with ONE Championship. Commentators speculated that her new contract made Lee the highest paid teenager in the history of MMA, male or female.

On March 11, 2017, Angela Lee defeated Jenny Huang of Taiwan and retained the Atomweight World Championship title. On May 27, 2017, she was successful in her second title defense against Istela Nunes of Brazil.

On November 8, 2017, Chatri Sityodtong announced that Angela Lee was involved in a serious car accident after she fell asleep at the wheel of her car. She managed to survive the incident with a concussion and minor burns. Lee's bout with Mei Yamaguchi that was scheduled for November 24 has been rescheduled to May 18, 2018, at One Championship Unstoppable Dreams in Singapore. Lee won via unanimous decision.

Lee was expected to face reigning strawweight champion Jingnan Xiong at ONE Championship 78: Heart of the Lion on November 9, 2018, in an attempt to become the first female two-division champion in ONE Championship. However, on November 5, 2018, Lee revealed that she was forced off the card due to a back injury. The fight eventually happened on March 31, 2019, at One Championship 90: A New Era. Lee was defeated via TKO in round 5, which snapped her undefeated streak.

At ONE Championship 96: Masters of Destiny, Angela Lee suffered another defeat at the hands of Michelle Nicolini, via unanimous decision.

Lee next defended her ONE Atomweight Championship against Xiong Jingnan – whose Strawweight Championship Lee failed to capture – at ONE Championship 100: Century on October 13, 2019. She won the fight by submission in the fifth round.

After pregnancy leave, Lee returned to defend her Atomweight title against ONE Women's Atomweight Grand Prix winner Stamp Fairtex at ONE 155: X on March 26, 2022. Surviving an early scare in the first round after being hurt by a liver punch, she won the bout via submission in the second round.

Lee challenged Xiong Jingnan for the ONE Women's Strawweight Championship at ONE on Prime Video 2 on September 30, 2022. She lost the fight by unanimous decision.

Personal life
Lee holds American and Canadian citizenship.

Lee is married to fellow mixed martial artist Bruno Pucci. On October 1, 2020, Lee announced on her social media that they are expecting a baby, due in April 2021.

Both Lee and her husband are head coaches at United BJJ Hawaii, a gym that they founded in 2021. The opening of their gym was delayed by several days as the result of vandalism just prior to the date.

Lee's younger brother Christian is the reigning ONE Lightweight World Champion and ONE Welterweight World Champion. Her youngest sibling, Victoria  (2004-2022) made her successful MMA debut at the age of 16 on February 26, 2021.

On January 7, 2023, Lee announced on Instagram that Victoria had died on December 26, 2022.

Championships and accomplishments

Pankration
World Pangration Athlima Federation World Championships:
2012 Agon (full contact) Girls, 16-17 yrs, 58 kg - Champion.
2012 Semi (semi contact) Girls, Juniors, 58 kg - Champion.

Folkstyle wrestling
 HHSAA Wrestling Circuit
 2013, 121 lbs, Girls - Champion.

Mixed martial arts
Amateur Career
Destiny MMA Women's Strawweight Championship (One time)
ONE Championship
ONE Women's Atomweight World Championship (One time; current)
Five successful title defenses
Performance of the Night (One time) 
 2016 Fight of the Year vs. Mei Yamaguchi
2022 MMA Fight of the Year 
 WMMA Press Association 
 2015 Newcomer of the Year
 2015 Submission of the Year vs. Natalie Gonzales Hills
 World MMA Awards
2018 Comeback of the Year vs. Mei Yamaguchi at ONE Championship: Unstoppable Dreams
MMAJunkie.com
 2016 May Fight of the Month vs. Mei Yamaguchi

Mixed martial arts record

|-
| Loss
| align=center|11–3
|Xiong Jing Nan
|Decision (unanimous)
|ONE on Prime Video 2
|
|align=center|5
|align=center|5:00
|Kallang, Singapore
|
|-
|Win
|align=center|11–2
|Stamp Fairtex
|Submission (rear-naked choke)
|ONE: X
|
|align=center| 2
|align=center| 4:50
|Kallang, Singapore
|
|-
| Win
| align=center|10–2
| Xiong Jing Nan
| Submission (rear-naked choke)
| ONE Championship: Century Part 1
| 
| align=center|5
| align=center|4:48
| Tokyo, Japan
| 
|-
| Loss
| align=center| 9–2
| Michelle Nicolini
| Decision (unanimous)
| ONE Championship: Masters of Destiny
| |
| align=center| 3
| align=center| 5:00
| Kuala Lumpur, Malaysia
|
|-
| Loss
| align=center| 9–1
| Xiong Jing Nan
| TKO (body kicks and punches)
| ONE Championship: A New Era
| 
| align=center| 5
| align=center| 1:37
| Tokyo, Japan
| 
|-
| Win
| align=center| 9–0
| Mei Yamaguchi
| Decision (unanimous)
| ONE Championship: Unstoppable Dreams
| 
| align=center| 5
| align=center| 5:00
| Kallang, Singapore
| 
|-
| Win
| align=center| 8–0
| Istela Nunes
| Submission (anaconda choke)
| ONE Championship: Dynasty of Heroes
| 
| align=center| 2
| align=center| 2:18
| Kallang, Singapore
| 
|-
| Win
| align=center| 7–0
| Jenny Huang
| TKO (punches)
| ONE Championship: Warrior Kingdom
| 
| align=center| 3
| align=center| 3:37
| Bangkok, Thailand
| 
|-
| Win
| align=center| 6–0
| Mei Yamaguchi
| Decision (unanimous)
| ONE Championship: Ascent to Power
| 
| align=center| 5
| align=center| 5:00
| Kallang, Singapore
| 
|-
| Win
| align=center| 5–0
| Rebecca Heintzman
| Submission (neck crank)
| ONE Championship: Tribe of Warriors
| 
| align=center| 2
| align=center| 1:08
| Jakarta, Indonesia
| 
|-
|  Win
| align=center| 4–0
| Lena Tkhorevska
| Submission (rear-naked choke)
| ONE Championship: Spirit of Champions
| 
| align=center| 2
| align=center| 3:26
| Manila, Philippines
| 
|-
| Win
| align=center| 3–0
| Natalie Gonzales Hills
| Submission (twister)
| ONE Championship: Pride of Lions
| 
| align=center| 1
| align=center| 2:24
| Kallang, Singapore 
| 
|-
| Win
| align=center| 2–0
| Mona Samir
| Submission (rear-naked choke)
| ONE Championship: Odyssey of Champions
| 
| align=center| 1
| align=center| 3:49
| Jakarta, Indonesia
| 
|-
| Win
| align=center| 1–0
| Aya Saber
| Submission (armbar)
| ONE Championship: Warrior's Quest
| 
| align=center| 1
| align=center| 1:43
| Kallang, Singapore
| 
|-

See also
List of current ONE fighters

Notes

References

Further reading

External links
 Angela Lee at ONE
 

1996 births
Living people
Singaporean female mixed martial artists
Canadian female mixed martial artists
American female mixed martial artists
Canadian practitioners of Brazilian jiu-jitsu
American practitioners of Brazilian jiu-jitsu
Female Brazilian jiu-jitsu practitioners
People awarded a black belt in Brazilian jiu-jitsu
Canadian female taekwondo practitioners
American female taekwondo practitioners
Canadian people of Chinese descent
American people of Chinese descent
Canadian people of Korean descent
American people of Korean descent
Canadian people of Singaporean descent
American people of Singaporean descent
Canadian expatriates in the United States
Atomweight mixed martial artists
Strawweight mixed martial artists
Mixed martial artists from Hawaii
Mixed martial artists utilizing taekwondo
Mixed martial artists utilizing Muay Thai
Mixed martial artists utilizing pankration
Mixed martial artists utilizing wrestling
Mixed martial artists utilizing Brazilian jiu-jitsu
Sportspeople from Vancouver
Sportspeople from Hawaii
21st-century American women
ONE Championship champions